Richard Umbers (born 16 May 1968) is a former Australian rules footballer who played with the Brisbane Bears in the Australian Football League (AFL).

Originally from Hampden Football League club South Warrnambool, Umbers played in the reserves for Geelong Football Club without playing a senior game and moved to Brisbane after being drafted by the Bears in the 1990 pre-season draft.

Brisbane were wooden spoon winners in his only AFL season, losing all four games that he played in. Umbers didn't kick a league goal but had three behinds in a match against Carlton.

References

External links
 
 

1968 births
Australian rules footballers from Victoria (Australia)
Brisbane Bears players
South Warrnambool Football Club players
Living people